Gudgudee is a 1997 Indian comedy film directed by Basu Chatterjee.

Plot 
Naive, easily influenced Ajay Prasad has been married for several years and lives in a remote part of India with his wife and a son. Ajay always imagines absurd things and make himself ridiculous. His family receives an invitation to attend a wedding in Bombay. As his wife Sunita Prasad and their son are unable to attend, Ajay is asked to attend on his own. In Bombay, he is met at the airport by Ravindranath, alias Ravi, who welcomes him and drives him to his apartment, in an upper-class area. Ajay finds out that his next door neighbor Chandni is a single woman, jovial and beautiful who acts in commercials and short advertisements. Ajay has an affair with her, with hilarious results and extreme comedy.

Cast 
Anupam Kher as Ajay Prasad
Pratibha Sinha as Chandni
Jugal Hansraj as Singer
Deb Mukherjee as Shekhar
Satish Kaushik as Ravindranath "Ravi"
Mushtaq Khan as Dr. M.M Surmawala
Jaya Bhattacharya as Mohini
Dolon Roy as Mano, Office Secretary
Naresh Suri as Manohar Lal
Indira Mukherjee as Room Mate
Murad Ali as Surat Smiling Model 
Master Wajid as Raja
Pratibha Lonkar as Sunita
Shahrukh Khan as himself (special appearance)

Soundtrack

References

External links 
 

1997 films
1990s Hindi-language films
Films directed by Basu Chatterjee
Films scored by Bappi Lahiri
Indian comedy films